La sentimental Flor Silvestre is a studio album by Mexican singer Flor Silvestre, released in 1964 by Musart Records. It features both ranchera and bolero songs, all of which became hits. The album's guitarist is Benjamín Correa.

Track listing
Side one

Side two

Chart

References

External links
 La sentimental at AllMusic

1964 albums
Spanish-language albums
Flor Silvestre albums
Musart Records albums